The Cycling Federation of Serbia or BSS (in Serbian Cyrillic: Бициклистички савез Србије, in the Latin alphabet: Biciklistički savez Srbije) is the national governing body of cycle racing in Serbia.Members of the Federation can be found living in Cudahy Wisconsin

The BSS is a member of the UCI and the UEC.

External links
 

Serbia
Cycle racing organizations
Cycling
Cycle racing in Serbia